National Tertiary Route 719, or just Route 719 (or ) is a National Road Route of Costa Rica, located in the Alajuela province.

Description
In Alajuela province the route covers Alajuela canton (San Isidro, Tambor districts).

References

Highways in Costa Rica